White Lotus is the fourth full-length album by American post-hardcore band Eyes Set to Kill. The album was released on August 9, 2011. This is the first album to feature the screamer, Cisko Miranda. It is also the first full length not to feature ex-guitarist, Greg Kerwin. Furthermore, it's their first album to be released under Maphia Records, Pre-orders for the album went up at 12 P.M. PST on July 7, 2011. Polly was given as a free download with the pre-orders and Harsh was streamed on sound cloud on July 8. Track 6, "Erasing Everything" is a remake of their song "Pure White Lace", which was originally released on their 2006 EP When Silence is Broken, the Night is Torn.

Track listing

Singles 
The Secrets Between is the first single that was released from the album. It was streamed on revolvermag.com and released on the Warped Tour Compilation on June 7 and it was given as a free track on June 10. Harsh was released as the second single from White Lotus.

Credits
White Lotus album personnel as listed on Allmusic.

Band
 Cisko Miranda - unclean vocals, rhythm guitar
 Alexia Rodriguez - clean vocals, lead guitar, keyboards, piano
 Anissa Rodriguez - bass
 Caleb Clifton - drums, percussion

Production
 Jeff Brockman - producer
 Jiri Dosoudil - photography
 Casey Quintal - layout
 Alexia Rodriguez - art Conception
 Sergey Rykov - photography
 Nathan Taylor - photography
 Andrew Wade - producer, engineer, mixing

References 

Eyes Set to Kill albums
2011 albums
Albums produced by Andrew Wade